The Sunset High School in Sunset, Louisiana, was listed on the National Register of Historic Places in 1999.  Located at 223 Marie Street, it was designed by architect Herman J. Duncan and was built in 1926.

It is a two-story masonry building.  Its National Register nomination stated "Although the building's exterior does exhibit a few low-key decorative features, the school should be classified as having 'no style' for the purposes of this nomination."  It was, however, deemed "significant in the area of education because its
1926 construction represents the 'coming of age' of public education in southwestern St. Landry Parish."

References

Schools in St. Landry Parish, Louisiana
National Register of Historic Places in St. Landry Parish, Louisiana
School buildings completed in 1926
1926 establishments in Louisiana